Gromovo is a settlement in Priozersky District of Leningrad Oblast, Russia, located 18 km northwest of Sosnovo, and a station of the Saint Petersburg-Kuznechnoye railway. Gromovo is situated on the northern shore of the Lake Sukhodolskoye, Karelian Isthmus. Until the Winter War and the Continuation War, it had been the administrative center of the Sakkola municipality of Finland. It hosts an interceptor aircraft base, (Gromovo (air base))  It is located only 90 km north of Saint Petersburg (Leningrad).

Notable people
Hanna Granfelt (1884-1952), Finnish opera singer

References

External links
Site about Sakkola municipality (in Finnish)

Rural localities in Leningrad Oblast
Karelian Isthmus